Tavite Lopeti (born 20 November 1998) is a United States rugby union player, currently playing for the Seattle Seawolves of Major League Rugby (MLR) and the United States national team. His preferred position is centre.

Professional career
Lopeti signed for Major League Rugby side Seattle Seawolves for the 2022 Major League Rugby season. 

Lopeti debuted for United States against New Zealand during the 2021 end-of-year rugby union internationals.

References

External links
itsrugby.co.uk Profile

1998 births
Living people
United States international rugby union players
Rugby union centres
American rugby union players
Seattle Seawolves players